Sausalito Marin City School District (SMCSD) is a public school district serving Sausalito and the unincorporated area of Marin City in Marin County, California. The school's administrative offices are in the Martin Luther King Jr. Academy facility in Marin City. Previously the administrative offices were in Bayside Elementary School in Sausalito.

As of the 2018–19 school year, the district had 558 students at its two schools. It now has one school, with preschool and middle school in Marin City and elementary school in Sausalito.

History
During much of the district's history, the demographics were evenly split between White students and African-American students. Most of the military families from nearby bases, who were mostly White, sent their children to Sausalito public schools. After the Cold War ended, the United States Department of Defense closed Fort Baker, Fort Barry, and the Presidio of San Francisco. Over 100 students left the school district in one period after the military transfers. By then, many families in Sausalito were sending children to private schools instead of public schools. By 1996 80% of the students were African American, and most of the district's students were poor. Despite the district's high student spending and small class sizes, test scores were low.

In 1997 the Marin County Civil Grand Jury published a report indicating that, despite the ample funding, the district had poor performance and violence. Between that year and 2011 the district had experienced, on six occasions, a conflict like a member of the board of trustees or a superintendent leaving without notice which required action from the Marin County Office of Education.

In 2006 Jennifer Gollan and Don Speich of the Marin Independent Journal said "Poor academic achievement in the Sausalito Marin City School District has rendered the concept of public neighborhood schools largely meaningless as dozens of children in the district, both black and white, flock to private schools."

A 2008 followup to the county report indicated improvements and suggested that the Bayside and Martin Luther King schools be returned to K-8 configurations.

In 2011 Rob Rogers of the Marin Independent Journal said that the district continually had, of all of the Marin County school districts, the lowest test scores. That year the University of Southern California's Rossier School of Education named Willow Creek Academy one of the top charter schools in California.

On Thursday January 21, 2014, the board voted to make the Marin City school a K-8 and to close Bayside, having its buildings be used by the Willow Creek charter school, which will use the Bayside campus to house three additional classrooms. The consolidation of Bayside into MLK will be in effect in the northern hemisphere fall of 2013.

In 2014 the district community and administration stated that there is no will to merge with another school district since the community does not wish to lose local control. At the time the district planned on making some cuts to educational services due to costs, despite having $30,000 per student per year due to a tax loophole.

In 2018 the office of the Attorney General of California had accused the Sausalito Marin City district of racially discriminating by keeping the two different schools open. The school board changed composition after elections in November 2018, and decided to reach an agreement with the Office of the Attorney General; three of the board members were viewed as being in favor of helping the Bayside MLK School. In August 2019 the State of California's courts ordered the Sausalito district to racially desegregate. In 2021 Willow Creek consolidated into the Martin Luther King School in Marin City.

Itoco Garcia became the superintendent in 2019. He is in this capacity until the end of the calendar year of 2022.

Staff 
The District had 19.0 full-time-equivalent classroom teachers  (2.0 kindergarten and 17.0 elementary).  The other 25.0 staff included 11.5 instructional aides or coordinators, 8 district and school administrators, and 5.5 support staff.  There were no guidance counselors or library staff.

Operations 
In 2015 it became the first school district in the United States to only serve organic and genetically modified organism-free food. A pilot program to only serve that kind of food was enacted at Bayside MLK in 2013.

The District budget as of 2004-05 was $5,333,000, or $17,203 per student.  Revenue sources were 6% federal, 81% local, and 13% state.

School Buildings Improvement Bond 
On November 2, 2004, District voters approved Measure I, the School Improvement Bond of 2004, a $15.9 million bond measure that authorizes funding for repairs, upgrades, and new construction projects to the three schools in the District.

The District contracted with the Professional Projects Advisory Group, VBN Architects and Turner Construction to prepare a detailed timeline and budget for construction.

Community demographics 
In 2019 the school district had a total of 465 students, with 361 at Willow Creek and 104 at Bayside MLK. In the former, the student body was 42% white, 27% Latino, and 10% African-American.

In 2000, the attendance area had a total population under age 18 of 1,265, of which 101 (8.0%) were Hispanic.

The racial composition was 
 White alone: 618 (48.9%)
 Black or African American alone: 395 (31.2%)
 American Indian or Alaska Native alone: 8 (0.6%)
 Asian alone: 79 (6.2%)
 Hawaiian or other Pacific Islander alone: 2 (0.2%)
 Some other race alone: 55 (4.3%)
 Population of two or more races: 108 (8.5%)

Schools

Martin Luther King, Jr. Academy 
Martin Luther King, Jr. Academy, formerly Bayside Martin Luther King, Jr., Academy had an enrollment of 51 students in seventh and eighth grades.  With 3.0 full-time-equivalent teachers, Martin Luther King, Jr. had a student-teacher ratio of 17.0.  The campus is located in the urban fringe of a large city.  Martin Luther King, Jr.is neither a charter or magnet school.

Effective 2021 it is the only school in the district. Its preschool and middle school are in Marin City and its elementary school is in Sausalito.

In 2021 there were people who signed a petition asking for the name of the school to be kept the same.

Student demographics
The majority of the students are Black or African American.  Enrollment by race or ethnicity and by gender are as follows:
 American Indian/Alaskan: 0 (0.0%)
 Asian: 1 (2.0%)
 Black: 40 (78.4%)
 Hispanic: 5 (9.8%)
 White: 4 (7.8%)
 Male: 24 (47.1%)
 Female: 26 (52.9%)

Martin Luther King, Jr.is a Title I School, with a School-Wide Program. The majority of the students are eligible for subsidized meals: 92.% for free lunch or reduced-price lunch.  There are no migrant students.

The statistics in the table include the combined demographics from Bayside Element and MLK Jr. Academy which were separate schools until 2013. The data is combined to best visualize the history as it relates to the current combined school.

Former schools

Bayside Elementary School
Bayside Elementary School had an enrollment of 106 students in kindergarten through sixth grade.  With 9.0 full-time-equivalent teachers, Bayside has a student-teacher ratio of 11.8.  The campus is located in the urban fringe of a large city.  Bayside is neither a charter or magnet school.

Student demographics
The majority of the students were Black or African American.  Enrollment by race or ethnicity and by gender were as follows:
 Amererican Indian/Alaskan: 6 (5.7%)
 Asian: 0 (0%)
 Black: 79 (74.5%)
 Hispanic: 15 (14.2%)
 White: 6 (5.7%)
 Male: 54 (50.9%)
 Female: 52 (49.1%)

Bayside was a Title I School, with a School-Wide Program. The majority of the students are eligible for subsidized meals: 74.5% for free lunch and 7.5% for reduced-price lunch.  There are no migrant students.

Willow Creek Academy
(See article on Willow Creek Academy.)

Consolidated into MLK School in 2021.

See also
 Non-high school district

Notes

Further reading
Prado, Mark. "Decision expected Thursday on fate of Bayside campus in Sausalito" (Archive). Marin Independent Journal. January 22, 2013.
Prado, Mark. "School change in Sausalito, Marin City renews racial equality issues" (Archive). Marin Independent Journal. January 5, 2013.
"The Sausalito Marin City School District: Then and Now" (Archive). 2007-2008 Marin County Grand Jury. June 26, 2008.

External links 
 CDS change

 Sausalito Marin City School District
 Sausalito Marin City School District (Archive, 2008–2012)
 Sausalito Marin City School District (Archive, 2006–2009)
 Sausalito Marin City School District (Archive, 2003–2006)
 Sausalito Marin City School District (Archive, 2001–2003)
 SMCSD School Accountability Report Card (SARC)
 2006 Adequate Yearly Progress (AYP) Report
 Marin County Office of Education, Marin County Public Schools, SMCSD, pp 58–60 (pdf)
 District Information at the National Center for Education Statistics
Willow Creek Foundation

School districts in Marin County, California
Sausalito, California